The 1912 University of New Mexico football team was an American football team that represented the University of New Mexico as an independent during the 1912 college football season. In its second season under head coach Ralph Hutchinson (who was also the university's first athletic director), the team compiled a 0–4 record and was outscored by a total of 76 to 15. H.A. Carlisle was the team captain.

Schedule

References

University of New Mexico
New Mexico Lobos football seasons
College football winless seasons
University of New Mexico football